Gang Related – The Soundtrack is a soundtrack for the Jim Kouf's 1997 crime film Gang Related. It was released on October 7, 1997, through Death Row Records, making it their first album to be distributed by Priority Records after Interscope Records dropped Death Row from their label. Production was handled by several record producers, including Daz Dillinger, Quincy Jones III, Binky Mack and Bud'da among others. The album features contributions by the likes of CJ Mac, J-Flexx, Tha Realest, members of Dogg Pound, Outlawz, Westside Connection, four songs by the supporting actor Tupac Shakur, and also marked the first national rap debut of Kansas City rapper Tech N9ne. The soundtrack peaked at #2 on the Billboard 200 albums chart in the US, and was eventually certified 2× Platinum by the Recording Industry Association of America.

This soundtrack along with 3 others (Above the Rim, Murder Was the Case & Gridlock'd) released on Death Row is packaged in a 4-disc set called The Death Row Archives [The Soundtracks].

Track listing

Charts

Certifications

See also
List of number-one R&B albums of 1997 (U.S.)

References

External links

1997 soundtrack albums
Hip hop soundtracks
Gangsta rap soundtracks
Albums produced by Bud'da
Priority Records soundtracks
Albums produced by Johnny "J"
Death Row Records soundtracks
Albums produced by Daz Dillinger
Albums produced by Quincy Jones III
Crime film soundtracks
Thriller film soundtracks
G-funk soundtracks
West Coast hip hop soundtracks